Qeysaraq (also Romanized as Qeyşaraq; also known as Qeyşarīyeh) is a village in Ardalan Rural District of Mehraban District, Sarab County, East Azerbaijan province, Iran. At the 2006 National Census, its population was 2,273 in 539 households. The following census in 2011 counted 2,260 people in 641 households. The latest census in 2016 showed a population of 2,155 people in 700 households; it was the largest village in its rural district. The village is in the Aji Chay valley.

References 

Sarab County

Populated places in East Azerbaijan Province

Populated places in Sarab County